This is a list of electoral division results for the Australian 1987 federal election in the state of Tasmania.

Overall results

Results by division

Bass

Braddon

Denison

Franklin

Lyons

See also 
 Results of the 1987 Australian federal election (House of Representatives)
 Members of the Australian House of Representatives, 1987–1990

References 

Tasmania 1987